SDGE is an acronym from the following:

Stochastic dynamic general equilibrium, a method in macroeconomics.
San Diego Gas and Electric, a utility firm in California.